Jean I (died 675) was an early Archbishop of Arles. Little is known of his life.

Identification

The diptychs point to two successive Johns who could be the same prelate.
Moreover, the numbering followed here probably forgets a previous Johannes between Aeon and Césaire at the beginning of the fifth century. 
Thus, depending on the classification adopted, this archbishop could be called John I, the usual denomination, John II or John III.

Biography

We have little information about the Archbishop John. 
We know of signatures as witness to documents in 658 and 659.
A letter was addressed to the monastery of Sainte-Marie d'Arles around 670.
The date of his death was 675.
According to the historian Jean-Pierre Papon, he received Theodore, Archbishop of Canterbury.
This happened in 657 at the earliest.

Notes

Sources

 

 

7th-century births
675 deaths
Archbishops of Arles